Mambajao, officially the Municipality of Mambajao, is a 3rd class municipality and capital of the province of Camiguin, Philippines. According to the 2020 census, it has a population of 41,094 people.

Etymology
Mambajao is from Visayan mambahaw (archaic form of mamahaw), meaning "to eat breakfast"; from the root word bahaw, "leftover rice from [last night]".

History
On January 4, 1855, Mambajao was separated from Catarman, and by July 6 that year it was proclaimed as a town, with Fr. Valero Salvo as its first parish priest. On July 17, 1864, tremors were felt across the town, which were signs of an ongoing activity within an undersea volcano near Catarman. By May 1, 1871, the volcano erupted, decimating the town of Catarman, which lead to almost all of its inhabitants moving to Mambajao. In January 1872, Barrio Agojo was transferred from Guinsiliban to Mambajao.

The town's principal crop in the 19th century was abaca, while coffee and cacao were mostly produced for local consumption. Sporadic fires were started from April 13, 1865, until 1881 by people attempting to burn down the town. By the 1880s, the town had become cosmopolitan, for its population then included Spaniards, Tagalogs, Cebuanos, Leyteños, Samareños, Ilocanos, and others in addition to Camigueños and Boholanos.

In 1942, the Japanese forces landed in the town of Mambajao.

On November 19, 2018, the old municipal hall of Mambajao was destroyed by a fire after it was spread to its second floor.

Geography

Climate

Barangays
Mambajao is politically subdivided into 15 barangays.

Demographics

Economy

Infrastructure

The Camiguin Sports Complex (Also known as Cong. Pedro Palarca-Romualdo Tourism and Sports Complex) is a sports complex located in Mambajao, and hosts to the 2016 Northern Mindanao Regional Athletic Meet, and Lanzones Festival events.

The main campus of the Camiguin Polytechnic State College is located in Mambajao.

Notable personalities

Mary "Maymay" Entrata, actress and singer who won the seventh edition of Pinoy Big Brother

References

External links

 [ Philippine Standard Geographic Code]
Philippine Census Information

Municipalities of Camiguin
Provincial capitals of the Philippines